Jairo Manfredo Martínez Puerto (born 14 May 1978) is a Honduran former professional footballer who played as a forward.

Club career
Nicknamed el Kiki, Martínez started his professional career at F.C. Motagua with whom he would spend the majority of his career.

Coventry City
Martínez most notably played for Coventry City between 2000 and 2002, although he rarely appeared for the first team. He was part of the team that were relegated from the Premier League in 2001, although he never made an appearance that season. The manager at the time, Gordon Strachan, was criticised for making poor signings and Martínez was seen as one of them by the Coventry fans, as well as his compatriot Iván Guerrero who was brought to the club around the same time. It could be argued that Strachan had nothing to do with either of these signings – the squad at that time was arguably too large, and many players brought by consortia more concerned with making a profit on future sales. However, Martinez scored 3 league goals in just 5 starts, with all goals coming away from home against Barnsley, Gillingham and Millwall.

He returned to Honduras and Motagua, then had a short stint in the Mexican second division and a season at Olimpia, before again turning out for Motagua. A knee injury eventually cut short his career and he retired in 2008, aged 30.

He scored 50 goals in total for Motagua, making him the 5th most prolific scorer in the club's history.

International career
Martínez made his debut for Honduras in a November 1999 friendly match against Guatemala and has earned a total of 38 caps, scoring 13 goals. He has represented his country in 4 FIFA World Cup qualification matches and played at the 2000 Summer Olympics. He also played at the 2001, 2003 and 2007 UNCAF Nations Cups as well as at the 2000, 2003s and 2007 CONCACAF Gold Cup.

His final international was a February 2008 friendly match against Belize.

International goals

Honours and awards

Club
F.C. Motagua
 Copa Interclubes UNCAF: 2007

References

External links
 
 

1978 births
Living people
People from La Ceiba
Association football forwards
Honduran footballers
Honduras international footballers
Pan American Games medalists in football
Pan American Games silver medalists for Honduras
Footballers at the 1999 Pan American Games
Footballers at the 2000 Summer Olympics
Olympic footballers of Honduras
1998 CONCACAF Gold Cup players
2000 CONCACAF Gold Cup players
2001 UNCAF Nations Cup players
2003 UNCAF Nations Cup players
2003 CONCACAF Gold Cup players
2007 UNCAF Nations Cup players
2007 CONCACAF Gold Cup players
F.C. Motagua players
Coventry City F.C. players
C.D. Olimpia players
Liga Nacional de Fútbol Profesional de Honduras players
Honduran expatriate footballers
Honduran expatriate sportspeople in England
Expatriate footballers in England
Expatriate footballers in Mexico
English Football League players
Medalists at the 1999 Pan American Games